Anthology is a two-disc career retrospective compilation box set by American singer-songwriter Carly Simon, released by Rhino Entertainment, on November 5, 2002. 

Simon personally selected all the songs for this collection. Over the course of the two discs, every one of her studio albums (up until that point) is chronologically represented with at least one song (not including her just-released Christmas album Christmas Is Almost Here, or her 1993 opera, Romulus Hunt: A Family Opera, on which she only actually performs on one track). The booklet features numerous photographs from Simon's archives, as well as extensive liner notes by Jack Mauro, a lifelong fan of Simon's.

Reception

Writing for AllMusic, Richie Unterberger rated the collection 4-stars-out-of-5, writing "For Carly Simon fans looking for something a little more extensive than a single-disc greatest-hits collection, but not something so large and expensive as her Clouds in My Coffee box set, Anthology is a good deal." Similarly, the New York Daily News wrote "Anthology is a lean and mean take on Simon's best. The 40 tracks still leave room for good ones that weren't hits. Simon's long absence has caused many listeners to forget her worth. Let this serve as a reminder."

Barnes & Noble wrote "As the recently released Anthology reminds us, Carly Simon's been delivering pop pleasures for more than 30 years. Anthology traces Carly Simon's evolution from confessional singer-songwriter to hit-making pop artist to skillful soundtrack contributor and interpreter. Comprising two CDs, each more than 75 minutes long, the set encompasses both the familiar and the neglected."

Track listings
Credits adapted from the album's liner notes.

Disc one

Disc two

Notes
 signifies a writer by additional lyrics

References

External links
 Carly Simon's Official Website

Rhino Records compilation albums
2002 compilation albums
Carly Simon compilation albums
Albums produced by Paul Samwell-Smith
Albums produced by Richard Perry
Albums arranged by Paul Buckmaster
Albums produced by Frank Filipetti